Sangar is a rural locality (a selo) in Kamakhalsky Selsoviet, Laksky District, Republic of Dagestan, Russia. The population was 203 as of 2010.

Nationalities 
Laks live there.

References 

Rural localities in Laksky District